The Proctor District is a business district in the north end of Tacoma, Washington. Primarily a center for locals to shop, the District has cultivated a small town "urban village" character.

Businesses
Situated in Tacoma's North End, the Proctor District is home to many small businesses. The Blue Mouse Theatre, built in 1923, is the oldest continuously operating movie theater in Washington and is open seven days a week. The Blue Mouse celebrated its 90th birthday on November 12, 2013 and has been on the National Register of Historic Places since 2010.

The center of the Proctor District is located at the cross streets of Proctor Street and North 26th Street in Tacoma. The 1927 Proctor Street bridge just north of the district was rebuilt in 2006.

A major commercial and residential development, Proctor Station, has been a controversial project due to its size and cost. It offers retail on the ground floor with apartments in the five floors above that. A proposed similar project at the other end of the Proctor District promises to be more controversial with many local residents formed in opposition and attempting to lower the height limitation from 65 feet to 45 feet, a move developers oppose as it will limit the profitability of the project. As of July 2022, the new building, Madison 25 has been constructed and provided 141 units to the neighborhood. A third building, Proctor III, is in development by the Gig Harbor-based Rush Companies.

Schools and churches
The Proctor District is the site of two public schools (Washington-Hoyt Elementary School and Mason Middle School), and the Tacoma Waldorf School.  It has a public library (Anna Lemon Wheelock Public Library), and a church, the Mason United Methodist Church, as well as a number of charitable organizations.

Charitable organizations and community services

 Mason United Methodist Church hosts several services for the public

 Tacoma Discovery Shop is a thrift shop that supports the American Cancer Society
 Fire House 13 is a designated "Safe Place for Newborns".

Farmers' market
Proctor hosts a farmers' market, the second largest in the city, which runs from the last weekend in March through the second-to-last weekend in December on Saturdays.

References

External links 
Proctor Association Website
City of Tacoma
North End Neighborhood Council
Neighborhood Tacoma Business Districts - Proctor Business District
Mason United Methodist Church
Proctor Farmers Market
Proctor District Store Directory
Labor Negotiator

North Tacoma, Washington
Neighborhoods in Tacoma, Washington